Habrocestum tanzanicum is a jumping spider species in the genus Habrocestum that lives in Tanzania, after which its species name is derived. It was first described in 2000.

References

Endemic fauna of Tanzania
Fauna of Tanzania
Salticidae
Spiders described in 2000
Spiders of Africa
Taxa named by Wanda Wesołowska